Treasure Island is a 1995 film directed by Ken Russell based on the 1883 novel Treasure Island by Robert Louis Stevenson.

Cast
Hetty Baynes as Long Jane Silver
Gregory Hall as Jim Hawkins
Michael Elphick as Billy Bones
Charles Augins as Blind Pew
Osmund Bullock as Captain Smollett
Martin Burns as Itchy
Jeanette Driver as Lani
Bob Goody as Dr. Livesey
Georgina Hale as Mum

Production
Russell said he made the film "to prove a point and enjoy myself at the same time. For it is my contention that most of the literary classics we see on television are generally too long, too slow, too samey, too costly and just too, too twee."

Russell wanted to make a literary adaptation that was low budget and done with a small crew. He pitched the idea to Channel Four who were enthusiastic. Russell put forward 12 titles and they selected Treasure Island because it could be programmed as a Christmas movie.

Russell adored the novel as a boy and made a film of it while young.  He wrote "My aim is to tell the story from Jim's point of view, which is where I begin to part company with the novel, which splits much of the narrative equally between Jim and Dr Livesey - a senior member of the expedition. To my way of thinking, this is one of the major flaws in the book and I feel I'm doing Robert Louis a favour in rectifying it. "

Russell made a number of other changes including casting Long John Silver as a woman and making Jim more of a "scamp".

References

External links

Treasure Island at Letterbox DVD
Treasure Island At BFI

1995 films
British adventure comedy films
Films directed by Ken Russell
Treasure Island films
1990s English-language films
1990s British films
British comedy television films